Cahiers du Bétar (French: Notebooks of Betar) was a monthly Zionist magazine which was published in Tunis, Tunisia, between 1938 and 1946. Its title was a reference to the revisionist Zionist youth movement, Bétar.

History and profile
Cahiers du Bétar was established in 1938 as a successor to another Jewish periodical entitled ha-Ivri. It was published by the Bétar movement's Tunisia branch on a monthly basis. Alfred Louzoun edited the monthly of which headquarters was in Tunis. Cahiers du Bétar was an supporter of the right-wing Zionism of Vladimir Jabotinsky. However, it did not manage to have significant influence as its successor ha-Ivri. It ceased publication in 1946.

References

1938 establishments in Tunisia
1946 disestablishments in Tunisia
Defunct political magazines
French-language magazines
Jewish magazines
Jews and Judaism in Tunis
Magazines established in 1938
Magazines disestablished in 1946
Magazines published in Tunisia
Mass media in Tunis
Monthly magazines
Betar
Zionism in Tunisia